Frank R. Mills (January 24, 1868 – June 11, 1921) was an American stage and silent film actor. In the 1890s he acted in a number of plays as a young juvenile.

He is frequently mistaken for other actors with the name Frank Mills. He began in films in 1906 in the historic Australian feature The Story of the Kelly Gang.

He died in an insane asylum in June 1921. He was survived by his wife Helen MacBeth.

Plays
The Way of the World(1901) *with Elsie De Wolfe

Filmography
The Story of the Kelly Gang (1906)
The Sundowner (1911)
The Lily and the Rose (1915)*uncredited
The Edge of the Abyss (1915)
The Golden Claw (1915)
The Moral Fabric (1916)
The House of Mirrors (1916)
The Wheel of the Law (1916)
The Flower of Faith (1916)
As Man Made Her (1917)
House of Cards (1917)
To-Day (1917)
The Price of Pride (1917)
A Sleeping Memory (1917)
The Eternal Mother (1917)
De Luxe Annie (1918)
The Unchastened Woman (1918)
Wives of Men (1918)
The Silent Woman (1918)
Wild Honey (1918)
Twilight (1918)
Let's Elope (1919)
The Misleading Widow (1919)
The Bramble Bush (1919)
The Right to Lie (1919)
Women Men Forget (1920)

References

External links

Frank R. Mills at IBDb.com
Frank Mills portraits c.1914 (University of Louisville)
Frank R. Mills portraits(Univ. of Washington Sayre collection)
kinotv.com

1868 births
1921 deaths
Male actors from Michigan
People from Michigan
19th-century American male actors
American male stage actors
20th-century American male actors
American male silent film actors